The Women's Oceania Cup is an international field hockey competition organised by Oceania Hockey Federation (OHF). It is held every two years to determine which teams will receive an automatic berth to the FIH World Cup and the Summer Olympics.

As of 2019, only Australia and New Zealand have reached the finals.

History
The Oceania Cup was introduced to international hockey in 1999. The first tournament was used as the Oceania qualifier for the 2000 Summer Olympics. Since its inception, the tournament has been held biennially.

Hosting rights for the tournament generally switch between Hockey Australia and the New Zealand Hockey Federation each tournament.

Australia are the most successful team, having won the title seven times.

Results

Summaries

Team appearances

Statistics

All-Time Table

All-Time Scorers

See also
Field hockey at the Pacific Games
Men's Oceania Cup

References

External links
Oceania Hockey Federation

 
International field hockey competitions in Oceania
Field hockey
Oceania Cup
Oceania Cup